Helena Flam (born 2 May 1951) is a Polish-born sociologist and Professor of Sociology at the University of Leipzig, Germany, known for her work on social organization, emotions and social movements.

Life and work 
After leaving Poland for Sweden in 1969, Flam studied sociology at Lund University, where she obtained a Filosofie kandidat (B.A.) degree in 1977. She then obtained an M.A., M.Phil. and Ph.D. from Columbia University's Department of Sociology in 1977, 1978 and 1982, respectively. Returning to Sweden, she did research at the Scandinavian Institutes of Administrative Research (SIAR) and SIFO as well as Uppsala University (1984–85). She then worked for the Swedish Collegium for Advanced Study in the Social Sciences (1985–87).

In 1987, inadvertently, her academic career in Germany began: she was first a Research Fellow at the Max Planck Institute for the Study of Societies, Cologne, then assistant professor at the University of Konstanz (1990-1993), and eventually full professor of sociology at the University of Leipzig.

Flam's focus is on political sociology, in particular social movement research, and the political dimension of migration, including institutional discrimination. She also contributed to the sociology of emotions and rule systems theory.

Books 
 The Shaping of Social Organization: Social Rule System Theory with Applications. London: Sage, 1987.  (edited with Tom R. Burns)
 States and Anti-Nuclear Movements. Edinburgh: Edinburgh University Press, 1994.  (edited & contributed four chapters)
 Mosaic of Fear: Poland and East Germany before 1989. Boulder, Colorado: European Monographs, 1995. 
 The Emotional 'Man' and the Problem of Collective Action. Berlin/New York: Peter Lang, 2000.  
 Pink, Purple, Green - Women’s, Religious, Environmental, and Gay/Lesbian Movements in Central Europe Today. Boulder, Colorado: East European Monographs, 2001  (edited)
 Emotions and Social Movements. London: Routledge, 2005.  (edited with Debra King & contributed two chapters)
 Rule Systems Theory: Explorations and Applications. Frankfurt: Peter Lang, 2008.  (edited with Marcus Carson & contributed one chapter)
 Theorizing Emotions: Sociological Explorations and Applications. Frankfurt a.M./New York: Campus, 2009.  (edited with Debra Hopkins, Jochen Kleres, and Helmut Kuzmics & contributed one chapter)
 Methods for Exploring Emotions. London. Routledge, 2015. (edited with Jochen Kleres, also contributed three chapters)

References

External links
Flam's personal page at Leipzig University

1951 births
Women sociologists
German sociologists
Living people
Columbia Graduate School of Arts and Sciences alumni
Lund University alumni
Swedish emigrants to Germany